Antimony oxychloride,  known since the 15th century, has been known by a plethora of alchemical names.  Since the compound functions as both an emetic and a laxative, it was originally used as a purgative.

History
Its production was first described by Basil Valentine in Currus Triumphalis Antimonii. In 1659 Johann Rudolf Glauber gave a relatively exact chemical interpretation of the reaction.

Vittorio Algarotti introduced the substance into medicine, and derivatives of his name (algarot, algoroth) were associated with this compound for many years.

The exact composition was unknown for a very long time. The suggestion of SbOCl being a mixture of antimony trichloride and antimony oxide or pure SbOCl were raised. Today the hydrolysis of antimony trichloride is understood; first the SbOCl oxychloride is formed which later forms Sb4O5Cl2.

Natural occurrence
Neither SbOCl nor the latter compound occur naturally. However, onoratoite is a known Sb-O-Cl mineral, its composition being Sb8Cl2O11.

Alternative historical names
 mercurius vitæ ("mercury of life")
 powder of algaroth
 algarel
 Pulvis angelicus.

Synthesis
Dissolving antimony trichloride in water yields antimony oxychloride:
SbCl3 + H2O → SbOCl + 2 HCl

References

Further reading
 
José Rodríguez has published a complete study devoted to the commercial network of chemical medicines developed by Vittorio Algarotti: The First Commercial Network of a Chymical Medicine:

Alchemical substances
Antimony(III) compounds
Emetics
History of pharmacy
Oxychlorides
Drugs with no legal status